Humberto Elgueta (10 September 1904 – 28 November 1976) was a Chilean football midfielder.

References

External links

1904 births
1976 deaths
Chilean footballers
Chile international footballers
Santiago Wanderers footballers
1930 FIFA World Cup players
Association football midfielders